Beijing Guoan Football Club is a professional football club that currently participates in the Chinese Super League under licence from the Chinese Football Association (CFA). The team is based in the Chaoyang District in Beijing and their home stadium is the Workers' Stadium with a seating capacity of 68,000. In early 2021, the shareholders changed from the real estate company Sinobo Group (64%) and CITIC Limited (36%) of CITIC Group to solely Sinobo Group (100%). The club is one of the four teams to have never been relegated from the Chinese top-flight since its debut in 2004.

The club's predecessor was called Beijing Football Club and they predominantly played in the top tier, where they won several domestic league and cup titles. On December 29, 1992, the club was recognized to become a completely professional football club making them one of the founding members of the first fully professional top tier league in China. Since then they have gone on to win their first ever professional league title in the 2009 league season as well as the 1996, 1997, 2003 and 2018 Chinese FA Cup.

According to Forbes, Guoan was the second most valuable football team in China, with a team value of US$167 million, and an estimated revenue of US$30 million in 2015.

History

Early club era
The club's first incarnation came in 1951 when the local government sports body decided to take part in China's first fully nationalized national football league tournament and decided to form a football team with the best players from Beijing and Tianjin to create the North China team. The team name was taken from the football team in the 1910 multi-sport event Chinese National Games that also represented the same regions. The team ended up finishing fourth in their debut season and with the football league gradually expanding, the players from Beijing and Tianjin were allowed to separate and the local Beijing government sports body was allowed to reform the club as Beijing Football Club in 1955. The club made its debut appearance in the 1956 season and wore an all white home kit and all red away strip. In the 1956 campaign the club were also allowed to enter their youth team called Beijing Youth B who actually went on to win the league title while Beijing came sixth that season. The club strengthened their hold on the following seasons when they won the 1957 and 1958 league titles. With these results, the club had become a major force within Chinese football, and with the club's youth team still participating within the top tier, there was a constant supply of players coming into the team to fight for places. Being China's capital city and for their success on the field, the club had become a feeder team for the Chinese national team. This often saw the club unable to complete a full championship schedule and the youth team were often used to represent the club, which did little to diminish Beijing football and actually resulted in the youth team to win the 1963 championship for the second time, showing the strength in depth of the region of Beijing football until 1966 when the Chinese Cultural Revolution halted football within the country. When football returned to the China, Beijing won the 1973 league title in the newly re-established footballing league. While Beijing once again re-established themselves as major title contenders, they did not win any major titles until the 1982, where they won the league title, followed by the 1984 league title and the 1985 Chinese FA Cup title. After this period, Beijing's performances seemed to have declined and were relegated for the first time in their history at the end of the 1988 season, however, their time within the second tier was short lived and they won the division title and promotion to the first tier at the end of the 1990 season. In total, Beijing had won the league title five times during the old Chinese National Football League era before the club was given full professionalism in 1992.

Professionalism
Beijing Guoan was formed on December 29, 1992, as a result of the Chinese football reform, which was the Chinese Football Association's attempt to professionalize the Chinese football league system. The club was set up by the CITIC Guoan of CITIC Group, a state-owned enterprise of China, and the Beijing Municipal Sports Committee. The club then took part in the 1994 Chinese Jia-A League season, making them a founding member of the first fully professional top tier league in China and changed their home colors to green to symbolize the change. In their first professional season, Beijing finished in a disappointing eighth out of twelve teams and the manager Tang Pengju was relieved of his duties. The club brought in Jin Zhiyang to manage them the following season and results under his reign improved enough for them to finish the 1995 campaign in the runners-up position. The following season Jin Zhiyang lead Beijing to their first professional trophy when he beat Jinan Taishan Jiangjun 4–1 to lift the 1996 Chinese FA Cup. Jin Zhiyang was able to retain the Cup the following year with a 2–1 victory against Shanghai Shenhua, which impressed the Chinese FA who lured him away from Beijing when they offered him a position with the Chinese national team. The assistant coach Shen Xiangfu stepped into the managerial role and in his debut season he guided the club to third within the league, however in his second season the team slid down to sixth and he left the club.

Foreign influences
Serbian Milovan Đorić became Beijing's first foray with a foreign manager when he joined the club at the start of the 2000 league season. His reign was exceptionally short-lived after he lost his first three games of the season before he was replaced with native coach Wei Kexing. At the start of the 2002 league season, Beijing hired their second foreign manager in Ljupko Petrović. Foreign influences continued in 2003, when the club signed a three-year endorsement contract with jointly owned South Korean company Beijing Hyundai, which resulted in the club changing its name to Beijing Hyundai to accommodate this. In 2005 Spanish football club Real Madrid went into negotiations with Beijing on a football development project. At the start of the 2007 league season two time Chinese FA Cup winner with Chongqing Lifan and Qingdao Beilaite, Lee Jang-soo was hired as the team's manager. The South Korean manager in his debut season guided the club to second within the league. By the 2009 league season, the club had returned to the Workers Stadium after it had been in renovation for the 2008 Summer Olympics under Lee Jang-soo's helm. It looked as if the club would be winning its first professional league title until a 2–0 defeat from Changchun Yatai on September 15, 2009, which saw the club slip to third place and Lee Jang-soo was unscrupulously fired with seven games remaining. Former Beijing player Hong Yuanshuo was immediately brought into the team and on the final day of the season Beijing thrashed Hangzhou Greentown 4–0 to clinch the 2009 league championship.

Ownership
Despite founded by CITIC Guoan Group, the stake of the football club was held by another subsidiary CITIC Corp., Ltd. of CITIC Group, a Beijing incorporated SPV for a possible listing in the mainland China since 2012. (CITIC Group invited other investors to purchase the new share of CITIC Guoan Group in 2014, making the company no longer a subsidiary of CITIC Group) In 2014, CITIC Group floated by backdoor listing most of their assets to their Hong Kong-based subsidiary CITIC Pacific (renaming to CITIC Limited) including the entire share capital of "CITIC Corp.", thus the stake of the football club was indirectly floated in a stock exchange.

On 27 December 2016, real estate company Sinobo Group participated the capital increase of the club for a reported 64% stake which was finalised on 10 January 2017, making them the largest shareholder. The club was also renamed to Beijing Sinobo Guoan F.C. Co., Ltd..

Name history
1956: Beijing Physical Education Normal University 北京体院队
1957–1960: Beijing 北京队
1961–1964: Beijing Youth 北京青年队
1965–1990: Beijing 北京队
1991: Beijing Shenzhou 北京神州队
1992: Beijing 北京队
1993–2002: Beijing Guoan 北京国安队
2003–2005: Beijing Hyundai 北京现代队
2006–2015: Beijing Guoan 北京国安队
2016: Beijing Guoan LeEco 北京国安乐视队
2017–2021: Beijing Sinobo Guoan 北京中赫国安队
2021–: Beijing  Guoan 北京国安队

Home stadiums
Three stadiums have been used as the home court of Beijing Guoan since 1994: Xiannongtan Stadium (1994–1995), Workers' Stadium (1996–2005, 2009–2020, 2023-), and Beijing Fengtai Stadium (2006–08, 2020-2022).

Kits and crest
Beijing Guoan F.C.'s main color is green.

Kit suppliers and shirt sponsors 

 Shirt sponsors only include China Super League and AFC Champions League.
 From 2011, All clubs in the Chinese Super League began wearing Nike kits.

Rivalries

Beijing Guoan's fiercest and oldest rivalry is against Shanghai Shenhua and is often referred to as the Jing-Hu Derby, a.k.a. the rivalry between Beijing and Shanghai. The rivalry with Shenhua is viewed as a manifestation of the rivalry that exist between the cities on which is the most import towards the country, as one is the center of government while the other is the financial centre of modern commerce within China. With each club being able to claim to having an extensive history spanning successful periods, direct competition for silverware, however rarely coincided until the 1997 league season. With Shenhua having won the 1995 league title and Beijing having won the 1996 Chinese FA Cup both teams looked as if they had the pedigree to win silverware that season and on July 20, 1997, in a vital league game, Beijing thrashed Shenhua 9–1 at the Workers' Stadium in Beijing. It was Beijing's largest victory and Shenhua's greatest defeat ever recorded. Soon after that match, both teams met again in the 1997 FA Cup final, which saw Beijing win the cup.

The Jing-Jin derby is a local rivalry between Beijing Guoan and neighboring Tianjin Jinmen Tiger. Both teams can trace their histories to the North China team before it split to form the Beijing Football Club and Tianjin Football Club. Since then both clubs have predominantly remained within the top tier of Chinese football providing a constant rivalry fixture, which has led to intense matches that have spilled out away from the stadiums and onto the streets that have led to property destruction as well as further intensifying their relationship.

Current squad

First team

Reserve team

Out on loan

Retired numbers

12 – Club Supporters (the 12th Man) retired in Jan 2016.

13  retired for the club legend, Xu Yunlong.

Senior club officials

|}

Technical staff

|}

Coaching history

Captain history

Honours

First team
All-time honours list including semi-professional Beijing period.

Chinese Super League
 Winners: 2009
 Runners-up (4): 2007, 2011, 2014, 2019

Chinese Jia-A League
 Winners (5): 1957, 1958, 1973, 1982, 1984

Chinese FA Cup
 Winners (5): 1985, 1996, 1997, 2003, 2018 (record)

Chinese FA Super Cup
 Winners (2): 1997, 2003

Personal honours

Results

All-time league rankings
As of the end of 2022 season.

Managerial history

No league games in 1959, 1966–72, and 1975.
 In group stage.
 In final group stage.
 Unable to complete full season, Youth team representing region.
 Did not play for position.
 Deducted one point.
 In the northern league.
 Includes playoffs.
 The 2020 Chinese Super League was held behind closed doors most of the time, attendance and stadium not applicable.
 The 2021 Chinese Super League was held behind closed doors as tournament-style competition due to COVID-19 pandemic; attendance and stadium not applicable.
 The 2022 Chinese Super League was held mostly behind closed doors due to COVID-19 pandemic; attendance and stadium not applicable as the earlier part of the season was played tournament-style in select locations. Guoan utilized the Rizhao International Football Center stadium for the latter portion of the season when the league returned to playing home-away games.

Key
 Pld = Played
 W = Games won
 D = Games drawn
 L = Games lost
 F = Goals for
 A = Goals against
 Pts = Points
 Pos = Final position

 R1 = Round 1
 R2 = Round 2
 R3 = Round 3
 R4 = Round 4

 F = Final
 SF = Semi-finals
 QF = Quarter-finals
 R16 = Round of 16
 Group = Group stage
 GS2 = Second Group stage
 QR1 = First Qualifying Round
 QR2 = Second Qualifying Round
 QR3 = Third Qualifying Round

International results

On neutral venue Beijing score is counted first
Key
 (H) = Home
 (A) = Away
 (N) = Neutral

Records

Wins
Biggest home win overall: 9–1 (Shanghai Shenhua July 20, 1997 – Jia-A League)
Biggest away win overall: 8–0 (New Radiant Aug 29, 1997 – Asian Cup Winners Cup)
Biggest home win in the league: 9–1 (Shanghai Shenhua July 20, 1997 – Jia-A League)
Biggest away win in the league: 6–1 (Shandong Luneng Aug 8, 2007 – Chinese Super League)
Biggest home win in all Asian competitions: 4–0 (Salgaocar SC Goa Oct 3, 1998 – Asian Cup Winners Cup)  4–0 (New Radiant Aug 27, 1997 – Asian Cup Winners Cup)
Biggest away win in all Asian competitions: 8–0 (New Radiant Aug 29, 1997 – Asian Cup Winners Cup)
Biggest home win in FA Cup: 6–0 (Qingdao Zhongneng July 18, 2012)
Biggest away win in FA Cup: 5–0 (Bayi FC Sept 20, 1997)

Defeats
Biggest away defeat overall: 0–5 (Shandong Luneng (a) June 2, 2004 – FA Cup)  0–5 (Suwon Samsung Bluewings April 10, 1998 – Asian Cup Winners Cup)
Biggest away defeat in the league: 1–5 (Dalian Wanda July 13, 1997 – Jia A League)
Biggest home defeat overall: 0–4 (Changchun Yatai Sept 29, 2012 – Chinese Super League)

Streaks
Consecutive league wins: 7 (from Aug 31, 2014 to Oct 26, 2014)
Consecutive league matches unbeaten: 18 (Sept 28, 2008, Round 18 – April 17, 2009, Round 5), (April 17, 2011, Round 3 – Aug 17, 2011, Round 21)
Consecutive league home matches unbeaten: 29 (Sept 29, 1996 – April 4, 1999)

See also
Beijing Guoan Talent Singapore

References

External links
 Official website 
 Stats on Sohu 
 Stats on Sina 
 Beijing Guoan Youth Football Development

 
Chinese Super League clubs
Football clubs in Beijing
Association football clubs established in 1992
Multi-sport clubs in China
1992 establishments in China